Bangladesh Railway Government Chandraprabha Vidyapitha is a boy's secondary school at Paksey, a railway divisional city in Bangladesh under Ishwardi Upazila in Pabna District.

See also
 Education in Bangladesh
 List of schools in Bangladesh

References

1924 establishments in India
Educational institutions established in 1924
High schools in Bangladesh
Schools in Pabna District
Boys' schools in Bangladesh
Railway schools in Bangladesh